Susan Keane may refer to:

 Susan Mascarin Keane, American tennis player
 Susan Keane, character in Suddenly Susan